Bismark Charles Kwarena Sie (born 26 May 2001), commonly known as Bismark Charles, is a Ghanaian professional footballer who plays as a striker for Bulgarian club CSKA Sofia.

Club career

Vushtrria
On 1 February 2020, Charles joined Football Superleague of Kosovo side Vushtrria. On 5 March 2020, he made his debut against Dukagjini after being named in the starting line-up and scored his side's second goal during a 3–3 home draw.

Trepça '89
On 1 August 2020, Charles joined Football Superleague of Kosovo side Trepça '89. On 18 September 2020, he made his debut in a 2–0 home defeat against Arbëria after coming on as a substitute at 73rd minute in place of Mohamed Darwish. On 25 October 2020, Charles scored hat-trick that was also his first goals for Trepça '89 in his seventh appearance for the club in a 4–3 home win over Ballkani in Football Superleague of Kosovo.

CSKA Sofia
On 12 February 2021, Charles joined Bulgarian First League side CSKA Sofia after a trial that was approved by head coach Bruno Akrapović. Fifteen days later, he made his debut in a 1–0 away defeat against Ludogorets Razgrad after coming on as a substitute at 76th minute in place of Georgi Yomov. Three days after his debut, "The Chancellor" as he is called by the media in Bulgaria, because of the same name as Otto von Bismarck marked his first goal for the "armymen", in the 2020–21 Bulgarian Cup round of 16 against Cherno More Varna.  On 19 May 2021, Bismark scored the winner in the Bulgaria Cup Final against Arda Kurdzhali in 85th minute, which granted CSKA Sofia their 21st Bulgarian Cup.

Career statistics

Club

Honours
CSKA Sofia
 Bulgarian Cup: 2020–21

References

External links

2001 births
Living people
People from Berekum
Ghanaian footballers
Ghanaian expatriate footballers
Ghanaian expatriate sportspeople in Kosovo
Ghanaian expatriate sportspeople in Bulgaria
Berekum Chelsea F.C. players
Football Superleague of Kosovo players
First Professional Football League (Bulgaria) players
KF Vushtrria players
KF Trepça '89 players
PFC CSKA Sofia players
Expatriate footballers in Kosovo
Expatriate footballers in Bulgaria
Association football forwards